Tea boy or teaboy may refer to:

The equivalent to a Tea lady
An alternate phrase for Ned (Scottish), a derogatory term for a hooligan or petty criminal
Colloquial term for an entry-level office job, similar to a McJob
Tape op, a worker performing menial tasks in a recording studio